The men's triple jump was one of four men's jumping events on the Athletics at the 1964 Summer Olympics program in Tokyo. It was held on 16 October 1964. 36 athletes from 23 nations entered, with 2 not starting in the qualification round. The maximum number of athletes per nation had been set at 3 since the 1930 Olympic Congress. The event was won by Józef Szmidt of Poland, the third man to repeat as Olympic champion in the triple jump. Just as in 1960, the Soviet Union took silver and bronze behind Szmidt.

Background

This was the 15th appearance of the event, which is one of 12 athletics events to have been held at every Summer Olympics. Returning finalists from the 1960 Games were gold medalist Józef Szmidt of Poland, bronze medalist Vitold Kreyer of the Soviet Union, fourth-place finisher Ira Davis of the United States, seventh-place finisher Manfred Hinze of the United Team of Germany, ninth-place finisher Ian Tomlinson of Australia, and twelfth-place finisher Fred Alsop of Great Britain. Szmidt had won the European championship again in 1962 and would have been the favorite but for a recent knee surgery that made his ability to repeat questionable.

The Bahamas, Hong Kong, Madagascar, Romania, and Senegal each made their first appearance in the event. The United States competed for the 15th time, having competed at each of the Games so far.

Competition format

The competition used the two-round format introduced in 1936. In the qualifying round, each jumper received three attempts to reach the qualifying distance of 15.80 metres; if fewer than 12 men did so, the top 12 (including all those tied) would advance. In the final round, each athlete had three jumps; the top six received an additional three jumps, with the best of the six to count.

Records

These are the standing world and Olympic records (in metres) prior to the 1964 Summer Olympics.

Józef Szmidt set a new Olympic record with 16.85 metres.

Schedule

All times are Japan Standard Time (UTC+9)

Results

Qualifying

The qualification standard was 15.80 metres with a minimum of 12 jumpers advancing. Each jumper had three opportunities. 13 met or exceeded the standard, advancing to the next round.

Final

The qualification jumps were ignored, each jumper starting with a clean slate in the final. Each jumper jumped three times; the six who had jumped the furthest received another three attempts.

References

Athletics at the 1964 Summer Olympics
Triple jump at the Olympics
Men's events at the 1964 Summer Olympics